The Keyserlingk family was a noble family from Westphalia. It was first mentioned with Hermann Keselinch on 16 November 1300. The direct line began with Albert Keserlink (mentioned 1443–1467), mayor at Herford.

In 1492 his son Hermann von Keyserlingk fought in Livland for the Teutonic Order. For this Wolter von Plettenberg gave him fiefs in Courland. In Prussia, the Russian Empire and the Electorate of Saxony his descendants worked for the state and in 18th century four of them gained the title of Graf. From this 4 Graf-lines 2 still exist. It was Count Carl Keyserlingk who was responsible for inviting Rudolf Steiner to his estate in Koberwitz (Kobierzyce) in 1924 to present the Agriculture Course which led to the founding of the biodynamic agriculture. There is also a Freiherr-line. There are a number of interesting articles on Keyserling(k) as well as an extensive bibliography on the family website.

Count Hermann Carl von Keyserlingk (1696–1764), a Russian ambassador to Saxony, helped Johann Sebastian Bach get the title Court composer to the King of Poland and the Elector of Saxony, received from Elector Frederick Augustus II in 1736.

After 1945 all property in the Baltics and East Prussia had to be abandoned. Since then around 1700 descendants scattered all over the world, mainly in Germany, United States,  Canada and Australia.

References

External links
Keyserlingk family website

German noble families

nl:Keyserlingk